Kevin Reilly may refer to:

Kevin Reilly (executive), Chief Creative Officer for Turner Entertainment Networks
Kevin P. Reilly (born 1949), sixth president of the University of Wisconsin System
Kevin Reilly (Louisiana politician) (1928–2012), businessman and philanthropist who served in the Louisiana House of Representatives
Kevin Reilly (Gaelic footballer) (born 1986), Gaelic football player from County Meath
Kevin Reilly (American football) (born 1951), NFL player; motivational speaker

See also
Kevin Riley (disambiguation)